Terri Williams-Flournoy (born January 11, 1969) is a women's basketball coach. From 2012 to 2021, she coached at Auburn University.  From 2004 to 2012, she was coach at Georgetown. She had previously served as an assistant coach at Georgetown, Georgia, and Southwest Missouri State. Her overall record as an assistant coach is 251–116, through 12 seasons.

She played college basketball at Penn State from 1988 to 1991. The Nittany Lions played in the NCAA tournament 3 of those 4 years, and had won 2 straight conference championships in 1990 and 1991.

Head coaching record

References

External links
 Terri Williams-Flournoy profile

1969 births
Living people
American women's basketball coaches
American women's basketball players
Auburn Tigers women's basketball coaches
Basketball coaches from Virginia
Basketball players from Virginia
Georgia Lady Bulldogs basketball coaches
Georgetown Hoyas women's basketball coaches
Penn State Lady Lions basketball players
Sportspeople from Hampton, Virginia